Nazo Ana High School is a boys' high school located in District 16 in Kabul, Afghanistan. The school is named after Nazo Tokhi, an Afghan poetess.

References

schools in Afghanistan
Schools in Kabul